A team leader is a person who provides guidance, instruction, direction and leadership to a group of individuals (the team) for the purpose of achieving a key result or group of aligned results. Team leaders serves as the steering wheel for a group of individuals who are working towards the same goal for the organisation.

The team leader monitors the quantitative and qualitative achievements of the team and reports results to a manager. The leader often works within the team, as a member, carrying out the same roles but with the additional 'leader' responsibilities – as opposed to higher-level management which often has a separate job role altogether. In order for a team to function successfully, the team leader must also motivate the team to "use their knowledge and skills to achieve the shared goals". When a team leader motivates a team, group members can function in a goal-oriented manner. A "team leader" is also someone who has the capability to drive performance within a group of people. Team leaders utilize their expertise, their peers, influence, and/or creativeness to formulate an effective team. 

Scouller (2011) defined the purpose of a leader (including a team leader) as follows: "The purpose of a leader is to make sure there is leadership … to ensure that all four dimensions of leadership are [being addressed].” The four dimensions being:  a shared, motivating team purpose or vision or goal,  action, progress and results, collective unity or team spirit, and attention to individuals. Leaders also contribute by leading through example.

Leaders and managers 
While the distinction between leader and manager may be confusing, the difference between the two is that a manager focuses more on organization and keeping the team on task while a team leader relates better to an artist and tends to have a more creative minded approach to problems. Team leaders can also be described as entrepreneurial and forward thinking. Team leaders tend to manage a group or team consisting of fewer people than a manager would.

The function of line manager and team manager are hybrid forms of leader and manager. They have a completely different job role than the team members and manage larger teams. The line manager and team manager report to middle or high management.

Personality differences 
Team leaders are expected to be focused on solving problems. Under a manager's watch, a team should function as smoothly and efficiently as possible. This form of leadership stresses a practical approach to the work environment that instills discipline throughout the team or organization. Managers can be trained to lead a team to great heights within a certain set of limits. The creativity and critical thinking required are not as strenuous as required by a true leader or entrepreneur. While managers need to be tolerant and able to create goodwill with the team and perhaps clients, they do not need to be necessarily hard-working, intelligent, or analytical. Instead managers are trained for a specific purpose. Entrepreneurs use a vision for what they see as being a success to guide their actions.

Goal orientation 
Managers tend to set goals that prioritize necessities and the culture of the organization over all else. Leaders, however, are progressive and want to set goals based on their personal wants and desires. An innovative spirit in a leader is what propels them to create something unique. They will use this single-minded passion to inspire and push others around them to greater achievements. Instead of being reactive to the wants of others, leaders are active in pursuing their goals. The resulting desires and objectives push the organization in the direction of the leader's vision.

Managers also tend to view work as something that warrants either coercion by a reward and punishment system. Managers lean toward limiting and narrowing the number of solutions available to make sure there is consistency and efficiency. Leaders move in the opposite direction and try to incorporate fresh solutions to new problems. They excite those around them with exciting images about what could be. This comes down to a fundamental character trait in which managers tend to be risk averse while leaders are more risk seeking. Where managers will work methodically to make sure everyday tasks go smoothly, leaders will have a difficult time staying focused when given the same tasks.

Relationships 
Leaders and managers tend to both build relationships with those that are working under them. With that being said it is important to note the type of relationship that is being built. Managers tend to maintain a distance from those that work under them by showing little or no empathy for them. Leaders on the other hand are very empathetic to their employees and those that they lead. The result is that followers, or employees, are motivated to work and pursue a common goal held by the leader and the rest of the group. In inter group conflicts and relationships, the managers sole focus is usually turning a win-lose situation into a win-win situation or maintaining the win-win situation. This leads to a desensitization of the managers views towards his employees feelings. For managers, relationships are not about creating a great work environment as they are about maintaining a balance of power.

Self-perceptions 
According to William James, there are two basic personality types: once-borns and twice-borns. Once-borns generally have stable childhoods and upbringings that lead them to be more conservative in their views. They strive for harmony in their environment and use their own sense of self as their guide. Twice-borns generally have an upbringing that is defined by a struggle to create some sort of order in their lives. As a result, these individuals tend to strive for separation of themselves from their peers and society. Their self-perception is not based on where they work, what organizations they are a part of, or even what they have already done in the past. Instead they are driven by the desire to create change.

Managers show the traits of once-borns while leaders exhibit the traits of twice-borns. Leaders see themselves as separate from the rest and try to play this sense of self by becoming entrepreneurs or great political leaders or even by chasing any endeavor that they feel will differentiate them. Managers want to maintain their harmonic environment and commit their lives to making sure nothing causes disturbances.

Concertive style of management 
While traditional leadership has maintained that one person generally leads several groups, each with their own leadership hierarchy, the concertive style of leadership gives the power to the group. While there will generally be a management group responsible for bigger decisions for the direction of the company or organization, the workers get to develop their own set of values and rules to govern themselves. This includes task division, problem solving, day-to-day functions, group prioritization, and internal conflict resolution. Instead of a manager or leader being responsible for producing the results, the management expects the burden to fall on each individual member of the group. By establishing a set of values, rules, and norms these groups can go on to manage themselves, usually with success.

Holacracy 
In a holacracy people have multiple roles while increasing efficiency, confidence, and communication in the workplace. This model was adopted by Zappos because they had "gone from being a fast speedboat to a cruise ship". While many cite more work to do and the large learning curve as obstacles to implementing the system, most workers are happier than when they had a managerial system of organizational structure.

See also
 Crew chief
 Squad leader
 Three levels of leadership model
 Captain (sports)

References

Organizational theory
Teams
Business occupations
Positions of authority